This list contains the locomotives and railbuses of the Grand Duchy of Oldenburg State Railways (Großherzoglich Oldenburgische Eisenbahn orGOE).

Locomotive classification and numbering 
The locomotives of the Grand Duchy of Oldenburg State Railways were given a name and railway number corresponding to their inventory number, which was allocated in the order in which they were delivered. On retirement, their numbers were not re-used.

The names chosen for locomotives were mainly those of German regions, rivers and towns in the Grand Duchy and the rest of Germany. Names of animals, planets ad figures from Nordic mythology were used. The names of the little tank engines were especially original, intending to describe the way they moved, such as HIN, HER, FLINK, FLOTT (literally: Here, There, Fast and Agile). By contrast, the names of historical people were not used, in order not to "give cause for unnecssary plays on words and connotations". On retirement the spare names were reused for newly delivered locomotives. The GOE held onto the practice of naming locomotives far longer than the other state railways(Länderbahnen); this continued until 1920.

The GOE never introduced formal locomotive classifications. Only in the run up to DRG renumbering were Prussian class designations used in order to simplify the naming and grouping of Oldenburg locomotives. Several locomotive classes that, at the time of the renumbering were already retired, are only referred to by locomotive classes in secondary sources.

Steam locomotives

Construction locomotives

Universal locomotives for all types of traffic 

During the first three decades of its existence, the GOE managed with a locomotive type for all railway services that, in constantly upgraded forms, was re-ordered repeatedly.

Passenger and express train locomotives

Goods train locomotives

Tank locomotives

Narrow gauge locomotives 

The GOE's narrow gauge locomotives were procured for working the metre gauge line on the island railway on Wangerooge.

Railbuses

See also 
History of rail transport in Germany
Grand Duchy of Oldenburg
Grand Duchy of Oldenburg State Railways
Länderbahnen
UIC classification

References 

 
 
 
 
 
 
 

Defunct railway companies of Germany
Transport in Lower Saxony
Locomotives of Germany
Deutsche Reichsbahn-Gesellschaft locomotives

Railway locomotive-related lists
Lower Saxony-related lists
German railway-related lists